Onion Valley, California is located at  near Onion Valley Creek in Plumas County.

It was a Gold Rush community, notable as the site of the first alpine skiing race in the United States

References

Plumas County, California